This is a list of the top points scorers and top try scorers in each season of Premiership Rugby, England's top division of rugby union. Formed in 1997 as an independent top division the awards form part of Premiership Rugby's end of season awards show.

The points award has been won by 16 different players, with Andy Goode recording the most wins with 4 at three different clubs.  Saracens players have won the award most often with four other winners alongside Goode.  The highest points total to win the award was 343 by Barry Everitt in 2001–02.

Points Scorers

By nationality

By club

Try Scorers

By nationality

By club

Notes

References

Rugby union records and statistics
Premiership Rugby